"The AB Chrysalis" is the twelfth episode of the second series of Space: 1999 (and the thirty-sixth overall episode of the programme).  The screenplay was written by Tony Barwick; the director was Val Guest.

Story 
It is 1,288 days after leaving Earth orbit, and in Command Centre, Koenig and the other Alphans nervously listen to a countdown from Fraser, followed by an explosion on the view screen. A shock wave is headed for Alpha, so Koenig declares red alert and orders all the Eagles to take shelter, in space, on the opposite side of the moon. After the shockwave hits, Alan Carter loses contact with Command Centre, and returns with all Eagles to find some fires, damage, and minor injuries, but an otherwise intact Moonbase Alpha.

Helena Russell, dictating her log, explains that Alpha has been repeatedly subjected to explosions that recur every twelve hours. "As we move closer, each succeeding shock wave is more violent." The eye of the explosion is a planet, but the shock waves are traveling only toward the moon, and not damaging the planet. The theory: an intelligence is warning the Alphans to stay away. Koenig, Alan, and Maya launch Eagle 1 to investigate.

As they approach the planet, they determine it has a chlorine-gas atmosphere and that it is surrounded by several moons that form a near-perfect circle around the planet. Landing on the nearest moon, they discover no evidence of life via the sensors, but do discover a collection of balloon-shaped buildings, the source of an unnaturally high level of energy. Koenig suits up to attempt to enter one of the buildings, and soon finds himself in an elevator that deposits him in a rock-walled cavern housing several globes perched atop stands. The globes and stands resemble the exterior buildings on the moons surface. Koenig is knocked unconscious by some sort of energy ray when he approaches one of the globes.

Koenig recovers, and he and Alan watch as one of the globes dislodges itself from its perch and bounces to another of the stands in the room, then another. Koenig realizes it is "some kind of probe" and eventually, is proven correct when the ball begins to communicate. Geometric figures display on a view screen, and Koenig draws a triangle to demonstrate he understands the method of communication. After the view screen prompts them to diagram their place or origin, text appears on the screen indicating that they are from Earth, and the cavern is filled with air. Koenig and Alan remove their helmets as a voice, speaking English, apologizes for the delay in recognizing their environmental needs and language.

Koenig explains that Moonbase Alpha is headed for their planet, and destruction, but the voice, a machine, cannot help them. It is waiting for its masters, the intelligent life of the planet, to be born. Until this occurs, it cannot do anything to help. The voice advises Koenig to leave, but he refuses. He wants answers. Maya buzzes in and warns of a great increase in energy, followed by the chamber filling with electrical explosions. Koenig and Alan return hurriedly to the Eagle and attempt to lift off. The Eagle is surrounded by an energy barrier, but with some struggle, Alan is able to escape the trap. They make their way toward the planet and touch down.

Immediately the ground beneath the Eagle lowers, and it is revealed they have landed on an elevator that brings them deep beneath the planet surface. Another voice informs them they may leave the Eagle, the atmosphere has been prepared for them. Maya, Koenig and Alan disembark and find themselves in another chamber with pedestals and globes. A globe bounces from one pedestal to another, and the voice they heard, emanating from a white globe, informs them it is Voice Probe 748. Koenig asks if the masters have physical form. "Of course, but the atmosphere they breathe is chlorine."

The voice explains that the living creatures on this planet "exist for an allotted span, and then grow old as you humans do. But instead of dying, they enter a chrysalis stage, to emerge rejuvenated, physically perfect, mentally clean. While they are sleeping they are defenseless." The globes serve as their protectors. But there is one of the living creatures, The Guardian, who keeps watch. Koenig asks to speak with The Guardian, and follows the new bouncing sphere toward another chamber. In it they find an oblong container in one of the "Centers of Rejuvenation." Koenig pleads with the creature inside the container to save Alpha, but his responses, translated by the globe, make no sense. The Guardian has gone senile, and must enter the rejuvenation chamber. Alan demands that the Guardian help them, and in struggling to keep the container from entering the chamber, tips it over and cracks the glass. Chlorine gas escapes as Maya and Koenig scramble from the room. Alan is left behind.

Maya transforms into a chlorine breathing creature to re-enter the room and save Alan, and then they both return Alan to the Eagle Koenig formulates plan, asking Maya if she can operate the ship's lasers. "Of course," she replies. Koenig returns to the chamber of spheres and threatens to destroy the dome if they do not help save Moonbase Alpha. Maya has been ordered to fire upon voice command, and after a battle between Koenig and the globe, she almost does, but then one of the inhabitants of the planet intervenes, She has emerged from the chrysalis state. "Wait, two of have been reborn." Koenig orders the laser disarmed, and the voice apologizes for the necessity of harming Koenig.

Koenig follows the globe into yet another chamber, this one with a window on a room awash in chlorine gas. Inside are two women, beautiful and unclothed. They explain that it was difficult to learn the human language: it took them nearly an hour. They want to discuss several matter of interest. Koenig's language has no way to express their names, so he can call them "A" and "B." As they explain their life cycle, Koenig repeatedly tries to get impress upon them the need to save Alpha. Finally, "A" gives her vote to saving Alpha, as long as Koenig agrees to her conditions. "B" points out that her yes vote was swayed by attraction, that "A" wants to be lovers with Koenig. "B" votes no, and because they are a society trying to achieve perfection, they are democratic. They must wait for the third member of their group to arise from the chrysalis state. The rub? He is the Guardian's brother, who was injured by Alan in the Center of Rejuvenation room. "It is very unlikely he will decide in your favor," states "B."

Back on Moonbase Alpha, Helena calls for yellow alert. Alpha is not moving away from the planet fast enough to save it. meanwhile, in the Eagle, Maya has calculated that if Koenig can delay the Chrysalis people from setting off another explosion for 4 hours, Alpha will have moved far enough away to withstand the resulting shock wave. But then, it will have moved too far away for the Eagle to return. Back at Command Centre, the next explosion is due in 20 minutes.

A new voice comes from the chlorine shrouded room, a male voice. "Commander Koenig." The third chrysalis has emerged. Koenig explains they meant no harm, but were simply motivated by desperation. The male chrysalis explains that, logically, his answer must be no, they cannot save Alpha. The Alphans have clearly demonstrated that they are a threat to the chrysalis people's survival. But he does offer the chance for Koenig, maya and Alan to survive. They may remain on the planet. Koenig explains that "loyalty is better than logic, hope is better than despair, and creation is better than destruction." Despite not having enough fuel to reach their moon, the three agree to leave, as "A" looks on forlornly. She discusses Koenig's parting words with her two companions, and appears to have understood the importance.

Alan carefully maneuvers the Eagle through the long upward passage they passed through upon landing, and they head away from the planet. The buildup of energy appears on the moon's surface again, and Helena calls for red alert in preparation for the next explosion. Koenig is patched into Alpha's comm system, and he makes a speech to its inhabitants: he commends them for their courage and devotion to duty. As the countdown to the explosion runs, Helens puts on a brave face for the staff in Command Centre. The blast occurs, and the shock wave quickly catches up with the Eagle. The crew are tumbled and shaken roughly, but the Eagle and crew survive the shock. Maya explains they limited the damaging effects of the explosion, giving them just enough of a speed boost so they could reach home.

In Command Centre, Maya explains that Psychons math is different than humans base 10 math, and that's why she can make calculations so much simpler than the computer. Koenig notes that, while that may be true, she still needs to convert her answers into Earth math, and with a dismissive look, brings up the conversion formula on the screen for Koenig to read. It is hopelessly complex. Koenig begins to follow Maya out of command centre to question her further, but is confronted by a smiling Helena. "You know, Alan's been telling me about these women on the planet. Beautiful and naked I understand." Koenig could hardly see them, he explains, though Helena is dubious. "Beautiful, naked... and green?" she says. "Green, were they?" he replies, "I didn't really notice that."

Cast

Starring 
 Martin Landau — Commander John Koenig
 Barbara Bain — Doctor Helena Russell

Also starring 
 Catherine Schell — Maya

Featuring 
 Nick Tate — Captain Alan Carter

Guest stars 
 Ina Skriver – A
 Sarah Douglas – B

Also featuring 
 Robert Rietti – Sphere (voice)
 John Hug – Fraser
 David Sebastian Bach – Guardian's brother
 Sarah Bullen – Kate
 Albin Pahernik – Creature
 Yasuko Nagazumi – Yasko

References

External links 
Space: 1999 - "The AB Chrysalis" - The Catacombs episode guide
Space: 1999 - "The AB Chrysalis" - Moonbase Alpha's Space: 1999 page
 

1976 British television episodes
Space: 1999 episodes